Shipman Township (T8N R9W) is located in Macoupin County, Illinois, United States. As of the 2010 census, its population was 1,433 and it contained 593 housing units.

Geography

Demographics

Adjacent townships
 Chesterfield Township (north)
 Polk Township (northeast)
 Hillyard Township (east)
 Bunker Hill Township (southeast)
 Brighton Township (south)
 Piasa Township, Jersey County (southwest)
 Fidelity Township, Jersey County (west)
 Ruyle Township, Jersey County (northwest)

References

External links
US Census
City-data.com
Illinois State Archives

Townships in Macoupin County, Illinois
Townships in Illinois